Nellie Flag (1932–1953) was an American Thoroughbred racehorse who was retrospectively named the  American Champion Two-Year-Old Filly of 1934. She was the first horse bred by Warren Wright's Calumet Farm to win a stakes race.

An early favorite, Nellie Flag finished fourth in the 1935 Kentucky Derby and seventh in the Preakness Stakes, the latter a race won by her dam in 1924. Following an injury, Nellie Flag was retired in mid July 1935  and stood at Calumet Farm as a broodmare where she died in 1953 at age twenty-one. She produced ten foals of which nine raced. Among her best were:
 Mar-Kell (born 1939) - American Champion Older Female Horse (1943)
 Nellie L. (born 1940) - won 1943 Kentucky Oaks, Acorn Stakes
 Sunshine Nell (born 1948) - multiple stakes wins including Barbara Fritchie Handicap, Autumn Days Handicap, Top Flight Handicap

References

 Nellie Flag's pedigree and partial racing stats

1932 racehorse births
1953 racehorse deaths
Racehorses bred in Kentucky
Racehorses trained in the United States
American Champion racehorses
Thoroughbred family 9-f